This is a list of RS Aero sailboat championships.

World Championships

References

RS Aero
World championships in sailing